Sheshdeh and Qarah Bolagh District is a district (bakhsh) in Fasa County, Fars Province, Iran. At the 2006 census, its population was 31,672, in 7,401 families.  The District has one city: Sheshdeh.  The District has two rural districts (dehestan): Qarah Bulaq Rural District and Sheshdeh Rural District.

References 

Fasa County
Districts of Fars Province